The BREST reactor is a Russian concept of lead-cooled fast reactor aiming to the standards of a generation IV reactor. Two designs are planned, the BREST-300 (300 MWe) and the BREST-1200 (1200 MWe). Main characteristics of the BREST reactor are passive safety and a closed fuel cycle.

The reactor uses nitride uranium-plutonium fuel, is a breeder reactor and can burn long-term radioactive waste. Lead is chosen as a coolant for being high-boiling, radiation-resistant, low-activated and at atmospheric pressure.

BREST-300 

The construction of the BREST-300-OD in Seversk (near Tomsk) was approved in August 2016. The preparatory construction work commenced in May 2020.

The first BREST-300 will be a demonstration unit, as forerunner to the BREST-1200.

The combination of a heat-conducting nitride fuel and the properties of the lead coolant allow for complete plutonium breeding inside the core. This results in a small operating reactivity margin and enables power operation without prompt neutron reactor power excursions. In simpler terms, the uranium 238 in the core is converted to plutonium, which itself will undergo an effective fission in the fast spectrum. This is in contrast to other fast reactor designs, where an outside blanket of uranium is required; placing too much uranium in the core section would lead to subcritical operation. 
In doing so, a substantial number of neutrons is required for breeding. This implies in turn, that in the reactor operation, there are "just enough" neutrons to operate, and no excess is present.

Advantages of lead as coolant 

The use of lead as a coolant has several advantages if compared to other methods for reactor cooling.
 Molten lead does not significantly moderate neutrons. Moderation occurs when neutrons are slowed down by repeated collisions with a medium. When the neutron collides with atoms that are much heavier than itself, almost no energy is lost in the process. Thus, the neutrons are not slowed down by lead, which ensures that the neutrons keep their high energy.
 Molten lead acts as a reflector for neutrons. Neutrons escaping the core of the reactor are to some extent directed back into the core, which allows a better neutron economy. This in turn enables more spacing between the fuel elements in the reactor, allowing better heat removal by the lead coolant.
 Lead undergoes almost no activation by neutrons. Thus, virtually no radioactive elements are created by absorption of neutrons by the lead. This is in contrast to the Lead-bismuth eutectic which was used in other fast designs, including in Russian submarines. The bismuth in this mixture (which has a lower melting point, 123.5 °C, than that of pure lead) is activated to some degree to polonium.
 Although virtually no neutrons are absorbed by the lead, lead is very effective at absorbing gamma rays and other ionizing radiation. This ensures that radiation fields outside the reactor are extremely low.
 In contrast to another relatively popular coolant that is used in fast reactors, molten sodium metal, lead does not have issues with flammability (although the combustion of sodium in air is a mild reaction), and will solidify from a leak. 
 The very wide temperature range at which lead remains liquid (more than 1400 K or °C) implies that any thermal excursions are absorbed without any pressure increase.
 As with all fast reactor designs, because of the high temperature and the high thermal inertia, passive cooling is possible in emergency situations. Thus, no electrical pumping is required, natural air convection is sufficient to remove residual heat after shutdown. To achieve this, the reactor is equipped with a dedicated passive heat removal system, that requires no electrical power.
 All fast reactor designs operate at substantial higher temperatures in the core than water cooled (and moderated) reactors. This allows a significantly higher thermodynamic efficiency in the steam generators. Thus, a larger portion of the nuclear energy is converted into electricity, more than 40% efficiency, compared to around 30% in water cooled reactors.
Similarly, as with all fast spectrum reactors, the coolant is not pressurized. This means that no pressure vessel is required, and the piping and ducts can be constructed with non-pressure resistant steel and alloys. Any leak in the primary coolant circuit will not be ejected at high pressures.
 Lead has a high thermal conductivity (35 W/m.K) compared to that of water (0.58), which means that heat transport from the fuel elements to the coolant is effective.

Disadvantages of lead as coolant 

 Lead has a substantially lower heat capacity than sodium, which means that more flow is required for heat removal of the core.
Lead also has a lower heat conductivity than sodium, which means that the heat transport is more effective in a sodium cooled fast reactor.
 Lead is toxic to humans.
 Lead as coolant can lead to corrosion of the reactor internals.

Technical data 
 Thermal power: 700 MW
 Electrical power 300 MW
 Average lead coolant temperature:  on entry,  on exit of the steam generator
 Loop number: 4
 Core height: 
 Fuel load: 
 Fuel campaign: 5 years

See also 
Fast breeder reactor
Fast neutron reactor
Generation IV reactor
Siberian Chemical Combine

References

External links 
 Design Features of BREST Reactors and Experimental Work to Advance the Concept of BREST Reactors
 Lead-Cooled Fast-Neutron Reactor (BREST), IAEA. 2015

Liquid metal fast reactors
Nuclear power reactor types
Nuclear reactors
Nuclear research reactors
Small modular reactor